Bilzingsleben is a village and a former municipality in the Sömmerda district of Thuringia, Germany. Since 1 January 2019, it is part of the municipality Kindelbrück. The village takes their coat of arms from the Bültzingslöwen, an ancient noble family that originated there.

References

Sömmerda (district)
Former municipalities in Thuringia